The 2018 National League 2, also known as the 2018 MPT Myanmar National League 2, is the 6th season of the MNL-2, the second division league for association football clubs since its founding in 2012. At the end of the 2017 MNL-2, City Yangon F.C. won the MNL-2 title. And then, City Yangon F.C. and  Sagaing United promoted to 2018 Myanmar National League. But City Yangon F.C. quit from Myanmar National League. So, Myawady FC auto promoted to 2018 Myanmar National League. City Yangon F.C. and Chin United F.C. abandoned their clubs. In 2018 National League 2, there is only seven will play for MNL-2 winner.

MPT and MNL signed a sponsor for the Myanmar National League, MNL-2 and Youth league. MPT signed 3 years sponsor start from 2018 to 2020.

Name Changed for 2018 National League 2
 Finance and Revenue FC changed to Mountain Lion.
 City Stars F.C. changed to Royal Thanlyin.
 Pong Gan FC changed to Kachin United.

Result

League table

Matches

Fixtures and results of the 2018 National League 2 season.

Week 1

Week 2

Week 3

Week 4

Week 5

Week 6

Week 7

Week 8

Week 9

Week 10

Week 11

Week 12

Week 13

Week 14

Top scorers

Awards

Monthly awards

References

External links
 Myanmar National League Official Website
 Myanmar National League Facebook Official Page

MNL-2 seasons
1
Myanmar